Aconopterus strandi is a species of beetle in the family Cerambycidae. It was described by Breuning in 1943. It is known from Chile.

References

Desmiphorini
Beetles described in 1943
Endemic fauna of Chile